Black Gravel (German: Schwarzer Kies) is a 1961 West German drama film directed by Helmut Käutner and starring Ingmar Zeisberg and Anita Höfer. The screenplay was written by Käutner and Walter Ulbrich. The film was shot in Lautzenhausen, Germany.

The film's sets were designed by the art director. While the interiors were shot at the Tempelhof Studios in Berlin, location shooting took place at Hahn Air Base.

Plot
The story takes place in postwar Germany, following Germany's loss in World War II. For years, people struggled with shortages of everything, housing, water, food, clothing. A military base for several thousand American soldiers is going to be built in the village of Sohnen. The locals eye them suspiciously, nonetheless recognizing the economic potential. Numerous individuals find ways to serve (and service) the Americans, turning barns into bars, becoming prostitutes, building the new airbase. Robert Neidhardt, who owns a truck, starts selling gravel on the black market. Robert flees during a police raid, causing a fatal accident. He keeps going, fleeing further, becoming more ruthless, causing the death of a couple.

Charges of anti-semitism
Käutner attempted to show postwar Germany as it was, gritty, smarting from defeat, still encumbered by anti-semitism, despite the denazification efforts. However, the Central Council of Jews in Germany protested against the film and filed a criminal complaint, labeling the portrayal of anti-semitism as the expression of it and citing the treatment of a character (Loeb) who is a Nazi concentration camp survivor and who is called a "dirty Jew" by "der alte Rössler" ("old man Rössler"). Though the director and producer said the Council misunderstood their intent, and the general secretary of the Council said he found the movie "much more anti-German than anti-Jewish," all the scenes with Jewish references were cut from the film.

In an issue of Der Spiegel published at the time the movie was released, an article called "Slice of Life" ("Eine Scheibe Leben"), begins with the scene in question.

Not until 2009 was the originally premiered film shown again, after an uncut version was uncovered.

Partial cast
Helmut Wildt as Robert Neidhardt
Ingmar Zeisberg as Inge Gaines
Hans Cossy as John Gaines
Wolfgang Büttner as Otto Krahne
Anita Höfer as Elli
 Gisela Fischer as 	Margot
 Ilse Pagé as Karla
Heinrich Trimbur as Eric Moeller
Peter Nestler as Bill Rodgers
Edeltraud Elsner as Anni Peel
Else Knott as Frau Marbach
Guy Gehrke as Wiechers, Jr.
Karl Luley as "der alte" Rössler
Max Buchsbaum as Loeb

See also
The Golden Plague (1954)

References

External links

Wiederentdeckt 149: Schwarzer Kies CineGraph 
Stills from the film 

1961 drama films
German drama films
West German films
Films directed by Helmut Käutner
Films shot at Tempelhof Studios
UFA GmbH films
1960s German films
1960s German-language films